Alain Préfaci (born 1 March 1957) is a French football manager and former player. As of 2020, he is the head coach of Régional 3 club US Castelginest.

Playing career 
Préfaci was a product of the Paris Saint-Germain Youth Academy. He made his debut for Paris Saint-Germain's first team in a 1–0 Coupe de France win against Marseille on 30 March 1982. His final match for the club was a 1–0 Coupe de France defeat against Mulhouse on 28 January 1984.

Managerial career 
Préfaci's first managerial role was as player-manager of ASPTT Toulouse. He would go on to coach US Plaisance du Touch and AS Toulouse Mirail before joining US Castelginest.

Career statistics

Honours 
Paris Saint-Germain
 Coupe de France: 1981–82

Notes

References 

1957 births
Living people
People from Poissy
French footballers
French football managers
Association football forwards
Association football midfielders
Association football player-managers
Paris Saint-Germain F.C. players
Amiens SC players

ES Viry-Châtillon players
Ligue 1 players
Ligue 2 players
French Division 3 (1971–1993) players